Massachusetts House of Representatives' 4th Worcester district in the United States is one of 160 legislative districts included in the lower house of the Massachusetts General Court. It covers the city of Leominster in Worcester County. Democrat Natalie Higgins of Leominster has represented the district since 2017.

The current district geographic boundary overlaps with that of the Massachusetts Senate's Worcester and Middlesex district.

Representatives
 Gerard Bushnell, circa 1858 
 Aaron Greenwood, circa 1859 
 Samuel Dwight Simonds, circa 1888 
 Edgar J. Buck, circa 1920 
 Philip Andrew Quinn, circa 1951 
 Fredrick W. Schlosstein 1965-1973 
 Henry R. Grenier, 1973-1976  
 Angelo Picucci 1979-1989
 Robert A. Antonioni 1989-1993
 Mary Jane Simmons, 1993-2004
 Jennifer L. Flanagan 2005-2009
 Dennis A. Rosa 2009-2017
 Natalie Higgins, 2017-current

Former locales
The district previously covered:
 Barre, circa 1872 
 Dana, circa 1872 
 Hardwick, circa 1872 
 Hubbardston, circa 1872 
 New Braintree, circa 1872 
 Petersham, circa 1872 
 Phillipston, circa 1872

See also
 List of Massachusetts House of Representatives elections
 Other Worcester County districts of the Massachusetts House of Representatives: 1st, 2nd, 3rd, 5th, 6th, 7th, 8th, 9th, 10th, 11th, 12th, 13th, 14th, 15th, 16th, 17th, 18th
 Worcester County districts of the Massachusett Senate: 1st, 2nd; Hampshire, Franklin and Worcester; Middlesex and Worcester; Worcester, Hampden, Hampshire and Middlesex; Worcester and Middlesex; Worcester and Norfolk
 List of Massachusetts General Courts
 List of former districts of the Massachusetts House of Representatives

Images
Portraits of legislators

References

External links
 Ballotpedia
  (State House district information based on U.S. Census Bureau's American Community Survey).

House
Government in Worcester County, Massachusetts